The River Brett is a river in Suffolk, England. Its source is in the villages to the north of Lavenham and it flows through Hadleigh to its confluence with the River Stour via Monks Eleigh, Brent Eleigh and Chelsworth.

References

External links

Rivers of Suffolk